Asianovela Channel was a Philippine pay television channel created by ABS-CBN and one of the former freemium channels of ABS-CBN TVplus. The channel aired Filipino-dubbed Korean dramas and Asian films, along with limited imported programming from ABS-CBN, Cinema One and Cine Mo!. It operated daily at 06:00 (PST) with sign-off on weekdays at 01:00 (PST) and on weekends at 02:00 (PST). It was available for a free-trial basis.

On June 1, 2020, Asianovela Channel temporarily took over the channel space of S+A (ABS-CBN Sports and Action). However, the channel permanently ceased broadcasting on July 1, 2020, due to the alias cease-and-desist order (ACDO) issued by the National Telecommunications Commission (NTC) and former Solicitor General Jose Calida. On September 10, 2020, all the defunct frequencies for Asianovela Channel (from channel 43) have been recalled by the NTC. In January 2022, the former frequencies for Asianovela Channel are now owned by Apollo Quiboloy's Sonshine Media Network International (SMNI).

Most of the acquired dramas by the Asianovela Channel are now expired and no longer holds the legitimate rights to air them, some few asian dramas were moved to its ad-interim replacement Kapamilya Channel as part of its Primetime Bida and Kapamilya Late Nights block permanently.

Former Programming

Korean dramas 
100 Days My Prince (2020)
Because This Is My First Life (2019)
Bubble Gum (2018)
Black (2018-2019)
Blade Man (2018)
Blood (2018-2019)
Cheongdam-dong Scandal (2019-2020)
Doctor Crush (2019)
Encounter (2019-2020)
Go Back Couple (2018-2019)
Goblin (2018)
Good Doctor (2018-2019)
Goodbye Mr. Black (2019)
Heard It Through the Grapevine (2018-2019)
High Society (2018)
Hwarang (2018)
Hwayugi: A Korean Odyssey (2019)
Hyde Jekyll, Me (2018)
I am Not a Robot (2018)
The K2 (2018)
The King is in Love (2018)
Legend of the Blue Sea (2018)
Live Up to Your Name (2019-2020)
Love in the Moonlight (2018)
Mama Fairy And The Woodcutter (2019)
Mask (2018)
Gangnam Beauty (2019-2020)
Mother (2019)
My Love Donna (2018) 
My Time With You (2018)
Oh My Lady (2018)
On the Way to the Airport (2018)
Orange Marmalade (2018)
Sensory Couple (2018) 
Signal (2019)
Something in the Rain (2019)
That Man Oh Soo (2019)
The Good Wife (2019)
Tomorrow, With You (2019)
Twenty Again (2018-2019)
Two Cops (2019)
Uncontrollably Fond  (2018)
W (2018)
Warm and Cozy (2018)
Weightlifting Fairy (2018)
Woman with a Suitcase (2018)
What's Wrong with Secretary Kim (2019)

Chinese/Taiwanese dramas 
A Love So Beautiful (2018)
Meteor Garden (2019)
Meteor Garden II (2019)
Meteor Garden (2019-2020)
My Dearest Intruder (2018)
Story of Yanxi Palace (2020)
Unforgettable Love (2018-2019)

Japanese dramas 
Hana Nochi Hare (2019)

Specials

Pantawid ng Pag-ibig: At Home Together Concert (March 22, 2020) (together with ABS-CBN, S+A, ANC, DZMM Radyo Patrol 630, DZMM Teleradyo, Jeepney TV, Metro Channel, MOR Philippines, iWant, and TFC)

Channel-produced programs
AC Say
Aja! Aja! Tayo in Jeju
Asianovela Channel: Fan Picks
AC Scoop
Asianovela Channel: K-Skool Kamp
Faney Avenue (2019)

Short segment film
 AsiaKnowVela
 Fanatics
 Music Videos Of Asianovela Channel's Drama
 Relate Ka Ba?
 AC Access

Programing blocks
 AC Weekend Cinema
  AC Asian Weekday Movie Fest

References

External links

ABS-CBN Corporation channels
Assets owned by ABS-CBN Corporation
Creative Programs
Filipino-language television stations
Defunct television networks in the Philippines
Television channels and stations established in 2018
2018 establishments in the Philippines
Television channels and stations disestablished in 2020
2020 disestablishments in the Philippines